Nenagh railway station serves the town of Nenagh and surrounding area in County Tipperary, in the Mid-West Region of Ireland.

The station is located on Martyrs Road, Tyone, Nenagh. It opened on the 5th of October 1863 and is on the Limerick-Ballybrophy railway line, located between Birdhill railway station and Cloughjordan railway station. Passengers can connect at Ballybrophy to trains heading northeast to Dublin or southwest to Cork or Tralee.

The buildings consist of a two-storey station house with a platform canopy supported on cast iron columns, a goods shed and a disused cast iron footbridge. The station is unstaffed and has a car park and sheltered bicycle parking.

Services

As of 2021, services were as follows:

Mon - Sat

 2 trains to Limerick Colbert (3 trains Mon - Fri)
 2 trains to Ballybrophy

Sundays

 1 train to Limerick Colbert
 1 train to Ballybrophy

Bus connections

Bus Éireann's Monday - Friday route 323 from Newport, County Tipperary to Nenagh serves Nenagh railway station once daily each way.

Other bus services serve Nenagh town, but not the train station itself.

See also
 List of railway stations in Ireland

References

External links
  Irish Rail Nenagh Station Website
 Nenagh Station on Eire Trains
 Ballybrophy-Roscrea-Nenagh-Limerick line

Railway stations opened in 1863
Iarnród Éireann stations in County Tipperary
Nenagh